Michal Gašparík (born 1956) is a former Slovak football player who played mostly for Spartak Trnava.

His son, Michal Gašparík, is also a footballer.

References

Living people
1956 births
People from Trnava District
Sportspeople from the Trnava Region
Slovak footballers
Slovak expatriate footballers
Slovak football managers
Association football midfielders
FC Spartak Trnava players
Dukla Prague footballers
FK Dukla Banská Bystrica players
AEL Limassol players
ŠKF iClinic Sereď managers
Slovak Super Liga managers
Czechoslovak expatriate sportspeople in Cyprus
Slovak expatriate sportspeople in Cyprus
Expatriate footballers in Slovakia